Stephen Batchelor may refer to:

Stephen Batchelor (author) (born 1953), Scottish-born author of books relating to Buddhism
Stephen Batchelor (field hockey) (born 1961), British Olympic field hockey player